William Clark (1881 – 17 March 1937) was a Scottish professional footballer who played in the Southern League for Bristol Rovers. He was signed from Port Glasgow Athletic in 1904 and won the Southern League championship in his first season with the club. He went on to make 133 League appearances, scoring 35 goals, before leaving to join Sunderland.

During his time at Bristol Rovers, Clark (an outside right) played in one Home Scots v Anglo-Scots international trial in 1908 but never gained a full cap for Scotland.

References

Sources

1881 births
1937 deaths
Footballers from Airdrie, North Lanarkshire
Scottish footballers
Port Glasgow Athletic F.C. players
Bristol Rovers F.C. players
Sunderland A.F.C. players
Bristol City F.C. players
Leicester City F.C. players
Cambuslang Hibernian F.C. players
English Football League players
Southern Football League players
Scottish Football League players
Association football outside forwards
Scottish Junior Football Association players